Sunland Park Racetrack & Casino is a racino located in Sunland Park, New Mexico, a suburb in Southern New Mexico.

Opened in 1959 as a Thoroughbred racing track, Sunland Park was the only legalized gambling venue in the region for many years. In 1999, at a time when horse racing was experiencing a decline as casinos and lotteries became commonplace, New Mexico legislators allowed slot machines at the track. Now with over 700 machines in play, racing at Sunland has benefited greatly, with purses increasing from a $35,000 daily average in the early 1990s to nearly a quarter million per day today.

Sunland Park was the track where jockeys Jerry Bailey, Pat Valenzuela, and Cash Asmussen got their starts. Bill Shoemaker, who hails from the area, also rode at Sunland.

The casino, open 112 hours a week, also offers many electronic table games including roulette, blackjack and Texas Hold 'Em.

Racing
The 2021-22 racing season, which features both Thoroughbreds and Quarter Horses, runs from December 31 through April 3. Live racing is traditionally offered four days each week on Tuesdays, Fridays, Saturdays, and Sundays. Year-round Simulcast wagering is also available on racetracks across the country.

Thoroughbreds
The live racing season is highlighted by the Sunland Derby, run at 1⅛ miles for three-year-olds on March 27, 2022. The race was granted a Grade 3 status for the 2010 running and now is an important preparatory race for the Kentucky Derby. The race is now included in the Road to the Kentucky Derby; awarding 50 points to the winner, 20 to second, 10 to third, and 5 to forth. The 50 points awarded the winner effectively guarantees entrance into the Kentucky Derby.

Other notable races include the $300,000 Sunland Park Oaks, 1-1/16 miles Kentucky Oaks prep for fillies; the $100,000 Harry W. Henson Handicap for fillies and mares at one mile; the $100,000 Riley Allison Derby, 6½ furlongs for three-year-olds; the $100,000 Mine That Bird Derby, 1 1/16-mile prep for the Sunland Derby; and the $100,000 Sunland Park Handicap for three-year-olds and up at 1⅛ miles.

Graded events
 
The following Graded events were held at Sunland Park in 2019.

Grade III

Sunland Derby

Quarterhorses
Sunlands top quarter horse race is the $350,000 Grade 1 Championship at Sunland Park, run January 2, 2022. The $175,000 added New Mexican Spring Futurity at 300 yards is run April 3, 2022..

Gallery

References

External links
 Official web site

 
Horse racing venues in New Mexico
Casinos in New Mexico
Buildings and structures in Doña Ana County, New Mexico
Tourist attractions in Doña Ana County, New Mexico
1959 establishments in New Mexico
Sports venues completed in 1959